Daniel Bradley may refer to:

 Daniel Joseph Bradley (1928–2010), Irish physicist
 Daniel Bradley (politician) (1833–1908), American politician from New York
 Daniel W. Bradley (born 1941), American virologist
 Daniel J. Bradley, Canadian-American chemist and petroleum engineer